Wisconsin is a state in the upper Midwestern United States. Wisconsin is the 25th-largest state by total area and the 20th-most populous. It is bordered by Minnesota to the west, Iowa to the southwest, Illinois to the south, Lake Michigan to the east, Michigan to the northeast, and Lake Superior to the north.

The bulk of Wisconsin's population live in areas situated along the shores of Lake Michigan. The largest city, Milwaukee, anchors its largest metropolitan area, followed by Green Bay and Kenosha, the third- and fourth-most-populated Wisconsin cities respectively. The state capital, Madison, is currently the second-most-populated and fastest-growing city in the state. Wisconsin is divided into 72 counties and as of the 2020 census had a population of nearly 5.9 million.

Wisconsin's geography is diverse, having been greatly impacted by glaciers during the Ice Age with the exception of the Driftless Area. The Northern Highland and Western Upland along with a part of the Central Plain occupy the western part of the state, with lowlands stretching to the shore of Lake Michigan. Wisconsin is third to Ontario and Michigan in the length of its Great Lakes coastline. The northern portion of the state is home to the Chequamegon-Nicolet National Forest.

At the time of European contact the area was inhabited by Algonquian and Siouan nations, and today is home to eleven federally recognized tribes. During the 19th and early 20th centuries, many European settlers entered the state, most of whom emigrated from Germany and Scandinavia. Wisconsin remains a center of German American and Scandinavian American culture, particularly in respect to its cuisine, with foods such as bratwurst and kringle. Wisconsin is home to one UNESCO World Heritage Site, comprising two of the most significant buildings designed by Wisconsin-born architect Frank Lloyd Wright: his studio at Taliesin near Spring Green and his Jacobs I House in Madison.

The state is one of the nation's leading dairy producers and is known as "America's Dairyland"; it is particularly famous for its cheese. The state is also famous for its beer, particularly and historically in Milwaukee, most notably as the headquarters of the Miller Brewing Company. Wisconsin has some of the most permissive alcohol laws in the country and is well known for its drinking culture. Its economy is dominated by manufacturing, healthcare, information technology, and agriculture—specifically dairy, cranberries and ginseng. Tourism is also a major contributor to the state's economy. The gross domestic product in 2020 was $348 billion.

Etymology
The word Wisconsin originates from the name given to the Wisconsin River by one of the Algonquian-speaking Native American groups living in the region at the time of European contact. French explorer Jacques Marquette was the first European to reach the Wisconsin River, arriving in 1673 and calling the river Meskousing (likely ᒣᔅᑯᐤᓯᣙ meskowsin) in his journal. Subsequent French writers changed the spelling from Meskousing to Ouisconsin, and over time this became the name for both the Wisconsin River and the surrounding lands. English speakers anglicized the spelling from Ouisconsin to Wisconsin when they began to arrive in large numbers during the early 19th century. The legislature of Wisconsin Territory made the current spelling official in 1845.

The Algonquian word for Wisconsin and its original meaning have both grown obscure. While interpretations vary, most implicate the river and the red sandstone that lines its banks. One leading theory holds that the name originated from the Miami word Meskonsing, meaning "it lies red", a reference to the setting of the Wisconsin River as it flows through the reddish sandstone of the Wisconsin Dells. Other theories include claims that the name originated from one of a variety of Ojibwa words meaning "red stone place", "where the waters gather", or "great rock".

History

Early history

Wisconsin has been home to a wide variety of cultures over the past 14,000 years. The first people arrived around 10,000 BCE during the Wisconsin Glaciation. These early inhabitants, called Paleo-Indians, hunted now-extinct ice age animals such as the Boaz mastodon, a prehistoric mastodon skeleton unearthed along with spear points in southwest Wisconsin. After the ice age ended around 8000 BCE, people in the subsequent Archaic period lived by hunting, fishing, and gathering food from wild plants. Agricultural societies emerged gradually over the Woodland period between 1000 BCE to 1000 CE. Toward the end of this period, Wisconsin was the heartland of the "Effigy Mound culture", which built thousands of animal-shaped mounds across the landscape. Later, between 1000 and 1500 CE, the Mississippian and Oneota cultures built substantial settlements including the fortified village at Aztalan in southeast Wisconsin. The Oneota may be the ancestors of the modern Ioway and Ho-Chunk nations who shared the Wisconsin region with the Menominee at the time of European contact. Other Native American groups living in Wisconsin when Europeans first settled included the Ojibwa, Sauk, Fox, Kickapoo, and Pottawatomie, who migrated to Wisconsin from the east between 1500 and 1700.

European settlements

The first European to visit what became Wisconsin was probably the French explorer Jean Nicolet. He canoed west from Georgian Bay through the Great Lakes in 1634, and it is traditionally assumed that he came ashore near Green Bay at Red Banks. Pierre Radisson and Médard des Groseilliers visited Green Bay again in 1654–1666 and Chequamegon Bay in 1659–1660, where they traded for fur with local Native Americans. In 1673, Jacques Marquette and Louis Jolliet became the first to record a journey on the Fox-Wisconsin Waterway all the way to the Mississippi River near Prairie du Chien. Frenchmen like Nicholas Perrot continued to ply the fur trade across Wisconsin through the 17th and 18th centuries, but the French made no permanent settlements in Wisconsin before Great Britain won control of the region following the French and Indian War in 1763. Even so, French traders continued to work in the region after the war, and some, beginning with Charles de Langlade in 1764, settled in Wisconsin permanently, rather than returning to British-controlled Canada.

The British gradually took over Wisconsin during the French and Indian War, taking control of Green Bay in 1761 and gaining control of all of Wisconsin in 1763. Like the French, the British were interested in little but the fur trade. One notable event in the fur trading industry in Wisconsin occurred in 1791, when two free African Americans set up a fur trading post among the Menominee at present day Marinette. The first permanent settlers, mostly French Canadians, some Anglo-New Englanders and a few African American freedmen, arrived in Wisconsin while it was under British control. Charles de Langlade is generally recognized as the first settler, establishing a trading post at Green Bay in 1745, and moving there permanently in 1764. Settlement began at Prairie du Chien around 1781. The French residents at the trading post in what is now Green Bay, referred to the town as "La Baye".  However, British fur traders referred to it as "Green Bay", because the water and the shore assumed green tints in early spring. The old French title was gradually dropped, and the British name of "Green Bay" eventually stuck. The region coming under British rule had virtually no adverse effect on the French residents as the British needed the cooperation of the French fur traders and the French fur traders needed the goodwill of the British. During the French occupation of the region licenses for fur trading had been issued scarcely and only to select groups of traders, whereas the British, in an effort to make as much money as possible from the region, issued licenses for fur trading freely, both to British and to French residents. The fur trade in what is now Wisconsin reached its height under British rule, and the first self-sustaining farms in the state were established as well. From 1763 to 1780, Green Bay was a prosperous community which produced its own foodstuff, built graceful cottages and held dances and festivities.

U.S. territory

Wisconsin became a territorial possession of the United States in 1783 after the American Revolutionary War. In 1787, it became part of the Northwest Territory. As territorial boundaries subsequently developed, it was then part of Indiana Territory from 1800 to 1809, Illinois Territory from 1809 to 1818, and Michigan Territory from 1818 to 1836. However, the British remained in control until after the War of 1812, the outcome of which finally established an American presence in the area. Under American control, the economy of the territory shifted from fur trading to lead mining. The prospect of easy mineral wealth drew immigrants from throughout the U.S. and Europe to the lead deposits located at Mineral Point, Dodgeville, and nearby areas. Some miners found shelter in the holes they had dug, and earned the nickname "badgers", leading to Wisconsin's identity as the "Badger State". The sudden influx of white miners prompted tension with the local Native American population. The Winnebago War of 1827 and the Black Hawk War of 1832 culminated in the forced removal of Native Americans from most parts of the state.

Following these conflicts, Wisconsin Territory was created by an act of the United States Congress on April 20, 1836. By fall of that year, the best prairie groves of the counties surrounding what is now Milwaukee were occupied by farmers from the New England states.

Statehood

The Erie Canal facilitated the travel of both Yankee settlers and European immigrants to Wisconsin Territory. Yankees from New England and upstate New York seized a dominant position in law and politics, enacting policies that marginalized the region's earlier Native American and French-Canadian residents. Yankees also speculated in real estate, platted towns such as Racine, Beloit, Burlington, and Janesville, and established schools, civic institutions, and Congregationalist churches. At the same time, many Germans, Irish, Norwegians, and other immigrants also settled in towns and farms across the territory, establishing Catholic and Lutheran institutions.

The growing population allowed Wisconsin to gain statehood on May 29, 1848, as the 30th state. Between 1840 and 1850, Wisconsin's non-Indian population had swollen from 31,000 to 305,000. More than a third of residents (110,500) were foreign born, including 38,000 Germans, 28,000 British immigrants from England, Scotland, and Wales, and 21,000 Irish. Another third (103,000) were Yankees from New England and western New York state. Only about 63,000 residents in 1850 had been born in Wisconsin.

Nelson Dewey, the first governor of Wisconsin, was a Democrat. Dewey oversaw the transition from the territorial to the new state government. He encouraged the development of the state's infrastructure, particularly the construction of new roads, railroads, canals, and harbors, as well as the improvement of the Fox and Wisconsin Rivers. During his administration, the State Board of Public Works was organized. Dewey, an abolitionist, was the first of many Wisconsin governors to advocate against the spread of slavery into new states and territories.

Civil War

 

Politics in early Wisconsin were defined by the greater national debate over slavery. A free state from its foundation, Wisconsin became a center of northern abolitionism. The debate became especially intense in 1854 after Joshua Glover, a runaway slave from Missouri, was captured in Racine. Glover was taken into custody under the Federal Fugitive Slave Law, but a mob of abolitionists stormed the prison where Glover was held and helped him escape to Canada. In a trial stemming from the incident, the Wisconsin Supreme Court ultimately declared the Fugitive Slave Law unconstitutional. The Republican Party, founded on March 20, 1854, by anti-slavery expansion activists in Ripon, Wisconsin, grew to dominate state politics in the aftermath of these events. During the Civil War, around 91,000 troops from Wisconsin fought for the Union.

Economic progress

Wisconsin's economy also diversified during the early years of statehood. While lead mining diminished, agriculture became a principal occupation in the southern half of the state. Railroads were built across the state to help transport grains to market, and industries like J.I. Case & Company in Racine were founded to build agricultural equipment. Wisconsin briefly became one of the nation's leading producers of wheat during the 1860s. Meanwhile, the lumber industry dominated in the heavily forested northern sections of Wisconsin, and sawmills sprang up in cities like La Crosse, Eau Claire, and Wausau. These economic activities had dire environmental consequences. By the close of the 19th century, intensive agriculture had devastated soil fertility, and lumbering had deforested most of the state. These conditions forced both wheat agriculture and the lumber industry into a precipitous decline.

Beginning in the 1890s, farmers in Wisconsin shifted from wheat to dairy production in order to make more sustainable and profitable use of their land. Many immigrants carried cheese-making traditions that, combined with the state's suitable geography and dairy research led by Stephen Babcock at the University of Wisconsin, helped the state build a reputation as "America's Dairyland". Meanwhile, conservationists including Aldo Leopold helped re-establish the state's forests during the early 20th century, paving the way for a more renewable lumber and paper milling industry as well as promoting recreational tourism in the northern woodlands. Manufacturing also boomed in Wisconsin during the early 20th century, driven by an immense immigrant workforce arriving from Europe. Industries in cities like Milwaukee ranged from brewing and food processing to heavy machine production and tool-making, leading Wisconsin to rank 8th among U.S. states in total product value by 1910.

20th century

The early 20th century was also notable for the emergence of progressive politics championed by Robert M. La Follette. Between 1901 and 1914, Progressive Republicans in Wisconsin created the nation's first comprehensive statewide primary election system, the first effective workplace injury compensation law, and the first state income tax, making taxation proportional to actual earnings. The progressive Wisconsin Idea also promoted the statewide expansion of the University of Wisconsin through the UW-Extension system at this time. Later, UW economics professors John R. Commons and Harold Groves helped Wisconsin create the first unemployment compensation program in the United States in 1932.

In the immediate aftermath of World War II, citizens of Wisconsin were divided over issues such as creation of the United Nations, support for the European recovery, and the growth of the Soviet Union's power. However, when Europe divided into Communist and capitalist camps and the Communist revolution in China succeeded in 1949, public opinion began to move towards support for the protection of democracy and capitalism against Communist expansion.

Wisconsin took part in several political extremes in the mid to late 20th century, ranging from the anti-communist crusades of Senator Joseph McCarthy in the 1950s to the radical antiwar protests at UW-Madison that culminated in the Sterling Hall bombing in August 1970. The state undertook welfare reform under Republican Governor Tommy Thompson during the 1990s. The state's economy also underwent further transformations towards the close of the 20th century, as heavy industry and manufacturing declined in favor of a service economy based on medicine, education, agribusiness, and tourism.

Two U.S. Navy battleships, BB-9 and BB-64, were named for the state.

21st century

In 2011, Wisconsin became the focus of some controversy when newly elected governor Scott Walker proposed, passed, and enacted 2011 Wisconsin Act 10—referred to as the "Budget Repair Bill"—which made large changes in the areas of collective bargaining, compensation, retirement, health insurance, and sick leave of public sector employees, among other changes. A series of major protests by union supporters took place that year in response to the changes, and Walker survived a recall election held the next year, becoming the first governor in United States history to do so. Walker enacted other bills promoting conservative governance, such as a right-to-work law, abortion restrictions, and legislation removing certain gun controls.  Walker's administration also made critical changes to Wisconsin's election process, enacting one of the most aggressive legislative gerrymanders in the country and replacing Wisconsin's nonpartisan state elections board with a commission of political appointees.  When Walker lost re-election in 2018, he collaborated with the gerrymandered Republican legislature to strip powers from the incoming Governor and Attorney General.  Since 2011, Wisconsin has seen increasing governmental dysfunction and paralysis, as the durable gerrymander insulates the legislature from electoral consequences.

Geography

Wisconsin is bordered by the Montreal River; Lake Superior and Michigan to the north; by Lake Michigan to the east; by Illinois to the south; and by Iowa to the southwest and Minnesota to the northwest. A border dispute with Michigan was settled by two cases, both Wisconsin v. Michigan, in 1934 and 1935. The state's boundaries include the Mississippi River and St. Croix River in the west, and the Menominee River in the northeast.

With its location between the Great Lakes and the Mississippi River, Wisconsin is home to a wide variety of geographical features. The state is divided into five distinct regions. In the north, the Lake Superior Lowland occupies a belt of land along Lake Superior. Just to the south, the Northern Highland has massive mixed hardwood and coniferous forests including the  Chequamegon-Nicolet National Forest, as well as thousands of glacial lakes, and the state's highest point, Timms Hill. In the middle of the state, the Central Plain has some unique sandstone formations like the Dells of the Wisconsin River in addition to rich farmland. The Eastern Ridges and Lowlands region in the southeast is home to many of Wisconsin's largest cities. The ridges include the Niagara Escarpment that stretches from New York, the Black River Escarpment and the Magnesian Escarpment.

In the southwest, the Western Upland is a rugged landscape with a mix of forest and farmland, including many bluffs on the Mississippi River. This region is part of the Driftless Area, which also includes portions of Iowa, Illinois, and Minnesota. This area was not covered by glaciers during the most recent ice age, the Wisconsin Glaciation. Overall, 46% of Wisconsin's land area is covered by forest. Langlade County has a soil rarely found outside of the county called Antigo silt loam.

Wisconsin has sister-state relationships with Germany's Hesse, Japan's Chiba Prefecture, Mexico's Jalisco, China's Heilongjiang, and Nicaragua.

Climate

Most of Wisconsin is classified as warm-summer humid continental climate (Köppen Dfb), while southern and southwestern portions are classified as hot-summer humid continental climate (Köppen Dfa). The highest temperature ever recorded in the state was in the Wisconsin Dells, on July 13, 1936, where it reached 114 °F (46 °C). The lowest temperature ever recorded in Wisconsin was in the village of Couderay, where it reached −55 °F (−48 °C) on both February 2 and 4, 1996.

Demographics

Population

The United States Census Bureau estimates that the population of Wisconsin was 5,822,434 on July 1, 2019, a 2.4% increase since the 2010 United States census. This includes a natural increase since the last census of 150,659 people (i.e., 614,771 births minus 464,112 deaths) and a decrease due to net migration of 12,755 people. Immigration resulted in a net increase of 59,251 people, and migration from within the U.S. resulted in a net decrease of 72,006 people.

According to HUD's 2022 Annual Homeless Assessment Report, there were an estimated 4,775 homeless people in Wisconsin.

According to the 2016 American Community Survey, 6.5% of Wisconsin's population were of Hispanic or Latino origin (of any race): Mexican (4.7%), Puerto Rican (0.9%), Cuban (0.1%), and other Hispanic or Latino origin (0.7%). The five largest ancestry groups were: German (40.5%), Irish (10.8%), Polish (8.8%), Norwegian (7.7%), and English (5.7%). German is the most common ancestry in every county in the state, except Menominee, Trempealeau, and Vernon. Wisconsin has the highest percentage of residents of Polish ancestry of any state.

Since its founding, Wisconsin has been ethnically heterogeneous. Following the period of French fur traders, the next wave of settlers were miners, many of whom were Cornish, who settled the southwestern area of the state. The next wave was dominated by "Yankees", migrants of English descent from New England and upstate New York; in the early years of statehood, they dominated the state's heavy industry, finance, politics, and education. Between 1850 and 1900, the immigrants were mostly Germans, Scandinavians (the largest group being Norwegian), Irish, and Poles. In the 20th century, a number of African Americans and Mexicans settled in Milwaukee; and after the end of the Vietnam War came an influx of Hmongs.

The various ethnic groups settled in different areas of the state. Although German immigrants settled throughout the state, the largest concentration was in Milwaukee. Norwegian immigrants settled in lumbering and farming areas in the north and west. Irish, Italian, and Polish immigrants settled primarily in urban areas. Menominee County is the only county in the eastern United States with a Native American majority.

African Americans came to Milwaukee, especially from 1940 on. 86% of Wisconsin's African-American population live in four cities: Milwaukee, Racine, Beloit, Kenosha, with Milwaukee home to nearly three-fourths of the state's black Americans. In the Great Lakes region, only Detroit and Cleveland have a higher percentage of African-American residents. 

33% of Wisconsin's Asian population is Hmong, with significant communities in Milwaukee, Wausau, Green Bay, Sheboygan, Appleton, Madison, La Crosse, Eau Claire, Oshkosh, and Manitowoc.

Of the residents of Wisconsin, 71.7% were born in Wisconsin, 23.0% were born in a different US state, 0.7% were born in Puerto Rico, U.S. Island areas, or born abroad to American parent(s), and 4.6% were foreign born.

Birth data

Note: Births in table add to over 100%, because Hispanics are counted both by their ethnicity and by their race, giving a higher overall number.

 Since 2016, data for births of White Hispanic origin are not collected, but included in one Hispanic group; persons of Hispanic origin may be of any race.

Religion

The percentage of Wisconsin residents who belong to various affiliations as of 2014 were: Christian 81% (Protestant 50%, Roman Catholic 29%), Mormon 0.5%, Jewish 0.5%, Muslim 0.5%, Buddhist 0.5%, Hindu 0.5%, and unaffiliated 15%.

Christianity is the predominant religion of Wisconsin. As of 2008, the three largest denominational groups in Wisconsin were Catholic, Evangelical Protestant, and Mainline Protestant. As of 2010, the Catholic Church had the highest number of adherents in Wisconsin (at 1,425,523), followed by the Evangelical Lutheran Church in America with 414,326 members, and the Lutheran Church–Missouri Synod with 223,279 adherents. The Wisconsin Evangelical Lutheran Synod, the synod with the fourth highest numbers of adherents in Wisconsin, has their headquarters in Waukesha, Wisconsin.

Crime

Statewide FBI Crime statistics for 2009 include 144 murders/non-negligent manslaughter; 1,108 rapes; 4,850 robberies; 8,431 aggravated assaults; and 147,486 property crimes. Wisconsin also publishes its own statistics through the Bureau of Justice Information and Analysis. The state reported 14,603 violent crimes in 2009, with a clearance rate (% solved) of 50%. The state reported 4,633 sexual assaults in 2009, with an overall clearance rate for sexual assaults of 57%.

Government

Wisconsin's Constitution outlines the structure and function of state government, which is organized into three branches: executive, legislative, and judicial. The Wisconsin Blue Book is the primary published reference about the government and politics of the state. Re-published every two years, copies are available from state legislators.

In a 2020 study, Wisconsin was ranked as the 25th easiest state for citizens to vote in.

Executive

The executive branch is headed by the governor. The current governor, Tony Evers, assumed office on January 7, 2019. In addition to the governor, the executive branch includes five other elected constitutional officers: Lieutenant Governor, Secretary of State, Attorney General, Treasurer, and State Superintendent of Public Instruction. Four members of the Wisconsin executive branch are Democrats. The Superintendent of Public Instruction of Wisconsin is a non-partisan position.

Legislative

The Wisconsin State Legislature is Wisconsin's legislative branch. The Legislature is a bicameral body consisting of the Assembly and the Senate.

Judicial

Wisconsin's court system has four levels: municipal courts, circuit courts, the Court of Appeals, and the Supreme Court. Municipal courts typically handle cases involving local ordinance matters. The circuit courts are Wisconsin's trial courts, they have original jurisdiction in all civil and criminal cases within the state. Challenges to circuit court rulings are heard by the Wisconsin Court of Appeals, consisting of sixteen judges who typically sit in three-judge panels. As the state's highest appellate court, the Wisconsin Supreme Court may hear both appeals from lower courts and original actions. In addition to deciding cases, the Supreme Court is responsible for administering the state's court system and regulating the practice of law in Wisconsin.

Federal

In the United States Senate Wisconsin is represented by Ron Johnson and Tammy Baldwin. Wisconsin is divided into eight congressional districts.

Taxes

Wisconsin collects personal income taxes (based on five income brackets) which range from 4% to 7.65%. The state sales and use tax rate is 5.0%. Fifty-nine counties have an additional sales/use tax of 0.5%. Milwaukee County and four surrounding counties have an additional temporary 0.1% tax that helps fund the Miller Park baseball stadium, which was completed in 2001.

The most common property tax assessed on Wisconsin residents is the real property tax, or their residential property tax. Wisconsin does not impose a property tax on vehicles, but does levy an annual registration fee. Property taxes are the most important tax revenue source for Wisconsin's local governments, as well as major methods of funding school districts, vocational technical colleges, special purpose districts and tax incremental finance districts. Equalized values are based on the full market value of all taxable property in the state, except for agricultural land. In order to provide property tax relief for farmers, the value of agricultural land is determined by its value for agricultural uses, rather than for its possible development value. Equalized values are used to distribute state aid payments to counties, municipalities, and technical colleges. Assessments prepared by local assessors are used to distribute the property tax burden within individual municipalities.

Wisconsin does not assess a tax on intangible property. Wisconsin does not collect inheritance taxes. Until January 1, 2008, Wisconsin's estate tax was decoupled from the federal estate tax laws; therefore the state imposed its own estate tax on certain large estates.

There are no toll roads in Wisconsin; highway construction and maintenance are funded in part by motor fuel tax revenues, and the remaining balance is drawn from the State General Fund. Non-highway road construction and maintenance are funded by local governments (municipalities or counties).

International relations

A Mexican consulate opened in Milwaukee on July 1, 2016. Wisconsin has had a diplomatic relationship with the Japanese prefecture of Chiba since 1990.

Politics

During the Civil War, Wisconsin was a Republican state; in fact, it is the state that gave birth to the Republican Party, although ethno-religious issues in the late 19th century caused a brief split in the coalition. The Bennett Law campaign of 1890 dealt with foreign language teaching in schools. Many Germans switched to the Democratic Party because of the Republican Party's support of the law.

Wisconsin's political history encompasses, on the one hand, "Fighting Bob" La Follette and the Progressive movement, and on the other, the Republican and anti-Communist Joe McCarthy. From the early 20th century, the Socialist Party of America had a base in Milwaukee. The phenomenon was referred to as "sewer socialism" because the elected officials were more concerned with public works and reform than with revolution (although revolutionary socialism existed in the city as well). Its influence faded in the late 1950s largely because of the red scare and racial tensions. The first Socialist mayor of a large city in the United States was Emil Seidel, elected mayor of Milwaukee in 1910; another Socialist, Daniel Hoan, was mayor of Milwaukee from 1916 to 1940; and a third, Frank P. Zeidler, from 1948 to 1960. Succeeding Frank Zeidler, the last of Milwaukee's Socialist mayors, Henry Maier, a former Wisconsin State Senator and member of the Democratic Party was elected mayor of Milwaukee in 1960. Maier remained in office for 28 years, the longest-serving mayor in Milwaukee history. Socialist newspaper editor Victor Berger was repeatedly elected as a U.S. Representative, although he was prevented from serving for some time because of his opposition to the First World War.

Through the first half of the 20th century, Wisconsin's politics were dominated by Robert La Follette and his sons, originally of the Republican Party, but later of the revived Progressive Party. Since 1945, the state has maintained a close balance between Republicans and Democrats. Recent leading Republicans include former Governor Tommy Thompson and Congressman Jim Sensenbrenner; prominent Democrats include Senators Herb Kohl and Russ Feingold, the only Senator to vote against the Patriot Act in 2001, and Congressman David Obey.

Federal elections

In 2020, Wisconsin leaned back in the Democratic party's direction as Joe Biden won the state by an even narrower margin of 0.7%. Biden's win was largely carried by Milwaukee and Dane counties with the rural areas of the state being carried by Trump.

Wisconsin has leaned Democratic in recent presidential elections, although Donald Trump managed to win the state in 2016 by a narrow margin of 0.8%. This marked the first time Wisconsin voted for a Republican presidential candidate since 1984, when every state except Minnesota and Washington D.C. went Republican. In 2012, Republican presidential candidate Mitt Romney chose Wisconsin Congressman Paul Ryan, a native of Janesville, as his running mate against incumbent Democratic President Barack Obama and Vice President Joe Biden. Obama nevertheless carried Wisconsin by a margin of 53% to 46%. Both the 2000 and 2004 presidential elections were quite close, with Wisconsin receiving heavy doses of national advertising, in accord with its status as a "swing", or pivot, state. Al Gore carried the presidential vote in 2000 by 5,700 votes, and John Kerry won Wisconsin in 2004 by 11,000 votes. Barack Obama carried the state in 2008 by 381,000 votes (56%).

Republicans had a stronghold in the Fox Valley, but elected a Democrat, Steve Kagen, of Appleton, for the 8th Congressional District in 2006. However, Kagen survived only two terms and was replaced by Republican Reid Ribble in the Republican Party's sweep of Wisconsin in November 2010, the first time the Republican Party had taken back both chambers of the state legislature and the governorship in the same election. The City of Milwaukee heads the list of Wisconsin's Democratic strongholds, which also includes Madison and the state's Native American reservations. Wisconsin's largest Congressional district, the 7th, had voted Democratic since 1969. Its representative, David Obey, chaired the powerful House Appropriations Committee. However, Obey retired and the once-Democratic seat was taken by Republican Sean Duffy in November 2010. The 2010 elections saw a huge Republican resurgence in Wisconsin. Republicans took control of the governor's office and both houses of the state legislature. Republican Ron Johnson defeated Democratic incumbent U.S. Senator Russ Feingold and Republicans took two previously Democratic-held House seats, creating a 5–3 Republican majority House delegation.

State elections

At the statewide level, Wisconsin is competitive, with control regularly alternating between the two parties. In 2006, Democrats gained in a national sweep of opposition to the Bush administration, and the Iraq War. The retiring GOP 8th District Congressman, Mark Green, of Green Bay, ran against the incumbent Governor Jim Doyle. Green lost by 8% statewide, making Doyle the first Democratic governor to be re-elected in 32 years. The Republicans lost control of the state Senate. Although Democrats gained eight seats in the state Assembly, Republicans retained a five-vote majority. In 2008, Democrats regained control of the State Assembly by a 52–46 margin, marking the first time since 1986 that the governor and state legislature were both Democratic.

With the election of Scott Walker in 2010, Republicans won both chambers of the legislature and the governorship, the first time all three changed partisan control in the same election. His first year in office saw the introduction of the 2011 Wisconsin Act 10, which removed collective bargaining rights for state employees. On February 14, 2011, the Wisconsin State Capitol erupted with protests when the Legislature took up a bill that would end most collective bargaining rights for state employees, except for wages, to address the $3.6 billion deficit. The protests attracted tens of thousands of people each day, and garnered international attention. The Assembly passed the bill 53–42 on March 10 after the State Senate passed it the night before, and sent it to the Governor for his signature. In response to the bill, enough signatures were gathered to force a recall election against Governor Walker. Tom Barrett, the mayor of Milwaukee and Walker's 2010 opponent, won the Democratic primary and faced Walker again. Walker won the election by 53% to 46% and became the first governor in United States history to retain his seat after a recall election.

Following the 2014 general election on November 4, 2014, the Governor, Lieutenant Governor, State Attorney General and State Treasurer were all Republicans, while the Secretary of State was a Democrat. However, Walker was defeated for a third term in 2018 by Democrat Tony Evers. Democratic U.S. Senator Tammy Baldwin was also elected to a second term and Democrats won all constitutional statewide offices on the ballot including Lieutenant Governor, Attorney General, Secretary of State, and State Treasurer, the first time this happened in Wisconsin since 1982. Later however, in April 2019, conservative judge Brian Hagedorn defeated his liberal opponent Lisa Neubauer by 6,100 votes.

Economy

In 2019 Wisconsin's gross state product was $349.416 billion, making it 21st among U.S. states. The economy of Wisconsin is driven by manufacturing, agriculture, and health care. The state's economic output from manufacturing was $48.9 billion in 2008, making it the tenth largest among states in manufacturing gross domestic product. Manufacturing accounts for about 20% of the state's gross domestic product, a proportion that is third among all states. The per capita personal income was $35,239 in 2008. In March 2017, the state's unemployment rate was 3.4% (seasonally adjusted).

In quarter four of 2011, the largest employers in Wisconsin were:
 Wal-Mart
 University of Wisconsin–Madison
 Milwaukee Public Schools
 U.S. Postal Service
 Wisconsin Department of Corrections
 Menards
 Marshfield Clinic
 Wisconsin Department of Veterans Affairs
 Target Corporation, and
 City of Milwaukee.

Agriculture

Wisconsin produces about a quarter of America's cheese, leading the nation in cheese production. It is second in milk production, after California, and third in per-capita milk production, behind California and Vermont. Wisconsin is second in butter production, producing about one-quarter of the nation's butter. The state ranks first nationally in the production of corn for silage, cranberries ginseng, and snap beans for processing. It grows more than half the national crop of cranberries. and 97% of the nation's ginseng. Wisconsin is also a leading producer of oats, potatoes, carrots, tart cherries, maple syrup, and sweet corn for processing. The significance of the state's agricultural production is exemplified by the depiction of a Holstein cow, an ear of corn, and a wheel of cheese on Wisconsin's state quarter design. The state annually selects an "Alice in Dairyland" to promote the state's agricultural products around the world.

A large part of the state's manufacturing sector includes commercial food processing, including well-known brands such as Oscar Mayer, Tombstone frozen pizza, Johnsonville brats, and Usinger's sausage. Kraft Foods alone employs more than 5,000 people in the state. Milwaukee is a major producer of beer and was formerly headquarters for Miller Brewing Company—the nation's second-largest brewer—until it merged with Coors. Formerly, Schlitz, Blatz, and Pabst were cornerstone breweries in Milwaukee.

Manufacturing

Wisconsin is home to a very large and diversified manufacturing economy, with special focus on transportation and capital equipment. Major Wisconsin companies in these categories include the Kohler Company; Mercury Marine; Rockwell Automation; Johnson Controls; John Deere; Briggs & Stratton; Milwaukee Electric Tool Company; Miller Electric; Caterpillar Inc.; Joy Global; Oshkosh Corporation; Harley-Davidson; Case IH; S. C. Johnson & Son; Ashley Furniture; Ariens; and Evinrude Outboard Motors.

Consumer goods

Wisconsin is a major producer of paper, packaging, and other consumer goods. Major consumer products companies based in the state include SC Johnson & Co., and Diversey, Inc. Wisconsin also ranks first nationwide in the production of paper products; the lower Fox River from Lake Winnebago to Green Bay has 24 paper mills along its  stretch.

The development and manufacture of health care devices and software is a growing sector of the state's economy, with key players such as GE Healthcare, Epic Systems, and TomoTherapy.

Tourism

Tourism is a major industry in Wisconsin—the state's third largest, according to the Department of Tourism. Tourist destinations such as the House on the Rock near Spring Green, Circus World Museum in Baraboo, and The Dells of the Wisconsin River draw thousands of visitors annually, and festivals such as Summerfest and the EAA Oshkosh Airshow draw international attention, along with hundreds of thousands of visitors.

Given the large number of lakes and rivers in the state, water recreation is very popular. In the North Country, what had been an industrial area focused on timber has largely been transformed into a vacation destination. Popular interest in the environment and environmentalism, added to traditional interests in hunting and fishing, has attracted a large urban audience within driving range.

The distinctive Door Peninsula, which extends off the eastern coast of the state, contains one of the state's tourist destinations, Door County. Door County is a popular destination for boaters because of the large number of natural harbors, bays, and boat launches on both the Green Bay and Lake Michigan sides of the peninsula that forms the county. The area draws more than two million visitors yearly to its quaint villages, seasonal cherry picking, and fish boils.

Film industry

On January 1, 2008, a new tax incentive for the film industry came into effect. The first major production to take advantage was Michael Mann's Public Enemies. While the producers spent $18 million on the film, it was reported that most of it went to out-of-state workers and for out-of-state services; Wisconsin taxpayers had provided $4.6 million in subsidies, and derived only $5 million in revenues from the film's making. During this period, the movie Transformers: Dark of the Moon also used Milwaukee as a filming location. This incentive was eliminated in 2013.

Energy

Wisconsin has no production of oil, gas, or coal. Its in-state electrical generation is mostly from coal. Other important electricity sources are natural gas and nuclear.

The state has a mandate that ten percent of its electrical energy come from renewable sources by the end of 2015. This goal has been met, but not with in-state sources. , a third of that ten percent comes from out of state sources, mostly wind generated electricity from Minnesota and Iowa. The state has agnostic policies for developing wind power in state.

Transportation

Airports

Wisconsin is served by eight commercial service airports, in addition to a number of general aviation airports. Milwaukee Mitchell International Airport is the largest international commercial airport located in Wisconsin.

Intercity bus service

Wisconsin is served by multiple intercity bus operators, which provide service to 71 stops and 53 cities.

Major highways

The Wisconsin Department of Transportation is responsible for planning, building and maintaining the state's highways. Eight Interstate Highways are located in the state.

Rail service

Amtrak provides daily passenger rail service between Chicago and Milwaukee through the Hiawatha Service. Also provided is cross-country service via the Empire Builder with stops in several cities across Wisconsin. Commuter rail provider Metra's Union Pacific North (UP-N) line has its northern terminus in Kenosha, the only Metra line and station in the state of Wisconsin. The Hop, a modern streetcar system in Milwaukee, began service in 2018. The 2.1 mile (3.4 km) initial line runs from Milwaukee Intermodal Station to Burns Commons. The system is expected to be expanded in the future.

Important municipalities

Over 68% of Wisconsin residents live in urban areas, with the Greater Milwaukee area home to roughly one-third of the state's population. With more than 590,000 residents, Milwaukee is the 30th-largest city in the country. The string of cities along the western edge of Lake Michigan is generally considered to be an example of a megalopolis.

With a population of nearly 260,000, Madison is consistently ranked as one of the most livable cities in both the state and country and is the fastest-growing city in Wisconsin.

Medium-size cities dot the state and anchor a network of working farms surrounding them. As of 2011, there were 12 cities in Wisconsin with a population of 50,000 or more, accounting for 73% of the state's employment.

Wisconsin has three types of municipality: cities, villages, and towns. Cities and villages are incorporated urban areas. Towns are unincorporated minor civil divisions of counties with limited self-government.

Education

Wisconsin, along with Minnesota and Michigan, was among the Midwestern leaders in the emergent American state university movement following the Civil War in the United States. By the start of the 20th century, education in the state advocated the "Wisconsin Idea", which emphasized service to the people of the state. The "Wisconsin Idea" exemplified the Progressive movement within colleges and universities at the time.

Today, public post-secondary education in Wisconsin includes both the 26-campus University of Wisconsin System, with the flagship university University of Wisconsin–Madison, and the 16-campus Wisconsin Technical College System. Private colleges and universities include Alverno College, Beloit College, Cardinal Stritch University, Carroll University, Carthage College, Concordia University Wisconsin, Edgewood College, Lakeland College, Lawrence University, Marquette University, Medical College of Wisconsin, Milwaukee School of Engineering, Ripon College, St. Norbert College, Wisconsin Lutheran College, Viterbo University, and others.

Culture

Residents of Wisconsin are referred to as Wisconsinites. The traditional prominence of references to dairy farming and cheesemaking in Wisconsin's rural economy (the state's license plates have read "America's Dairyland" since 1940) have led to the nickname (sometimes used pejoratively among non-residents) of "cheeseheads", and to the creation of "cheesehead hats" made of yellow foam in the shape of a wedge of cheese.

Numerous ethnic festivals are held throughout Wisconsin to celebrate the heritage of its citizens. Such festivals include Summerfest, Oktoberfest, Polish Fest, Festa Italiana, Irish Fest, Bastille Days, Syttende Mai (Norwegian Constitution Day), Brat(wurst) Days in Sheboygan, Polka Days, Cheese Days in Monroe and Mequon, African World Festival, Indian Summer, Arab Fest, Wisconsin Highland Games, and many others.

Art

Music

Wisconsin's music festivals include Eaux Claires, Country Fest, Country Jam USA, the Hodag Country Festival, Porterfield Country Music Festival, Country Thunder USA in Twin Lakes, and Country USA. Milwaukee hosts Summerfest, dubbed "The World's Largest Music Festival", every year. This festival is held at the lakefront Henry Maier Festival Park just south of downtown, as are a summer-long array of ethnic musical festivals. The Wisconsin Area Music Industry provides an annual WAMI event where it presents an awards show for top Wisconsin artists.

Architecture

The Milwaukee Art Museum, with its brise soleil designed by Santiago Calatrava, is known for its interesting architecture. Monona Terrace in Madison, a convention center designed by Taliesin architect Anthony Puttnam, is based on a 1930s design by Wisconsin native Frank Lloyd Wright. Wright's home and studio in the 20th century was at Taliesin, south of Spring Green. Decades after Wright's death, Taliesin remains an architectural office and school for his followers.

With the immigration of northern Europeans into Wisconsin and the upper Midwest, they brought the techniques of building Log homes with them.

Alcohol culture

Drinking has long been considered a significant part of Wisconsin culture, and the state ranks at or near the top of national measures of per-capita alcohol consumption, consumption of alcohol per state, and proportion of drinkers. Consumption per-capita per-event, however, ranks low among the nation; number of events (number of times alcohol is involved) is significantly higher or highest, but consumption at each event smaller, marking Wisconsin's consumption as frequent and moderate. Factors such as cultural identification with the state's heritage of German immigration, the long-standing presence of major breweries in Milwaukee, and a cold climate are often associated with the prevalence of drinking in Wisconsin.

In Wisconsin, the legal drinking age is 21, except when accompanied by a parent, guardian, or spouse who is at least 21 years old. Age requirements are waived for possessing alcohol when employed by a brewer, brewpub, beer and/or liquor wholesaler, or producer of alcohol fuel. The minimum legal age to purchase alcohol is 21, with no exceptions. The Absolute Sobriety law states that any person not of legal drinking age (currently 21) may not drive after consuming alcohol.

On September 30, 2003, the state legislature, reluctant to lower a DUI offense from BAC 0.10 to 0.08, did so only as a result of federal government pressure. The Wisconsin Tavern League opposes raising the alcoholic beverage tax. The Milwaukee Journal Sentinel series "Wasted in Wisconsin" examined this situation.

Recreation

The varied landscape of Wisconsin makes the state a popular vacation destination for outdoor recreation. Winter events include skiing, ice fishing and snowmobile derbies. Wisconsin is situated on two Great Lakes and has many inland lakes of varied size; the state contains  of water, more than all but three other states—Alaska, Michigan, and Florida.

Outdoor activities are popular in Wisconsin, especially hunting and fishing. One of the most prevalent game animals is the whitetail deer. Each year in Wisconsin, well over 600,000 deer-hunting licenses are sold. In 2008, the Wisconsin Department of Natural Resources projected the pre-hunt deer population to be between 1.5 and 1.7 million.

Sports

Wisconsin is represented by major league teams in three sports: football, baseball, and basketball. Lambeau Field, located in Green Bay, Wisconsin, is home to the National Football League's Green Bay Packers. The Packers have been part of the NFL since the league's second season in 1921 and hold the record for the most NFL titles, earning the city of Green Bay the nickname "Titletown USA". The Packers are the smallest city franchise in the NFL and the only one owned by shareholders statewide. The franchise was founded by "Curly" Lambeau, who played and coached for them. The Green Bay Packers are one of the most successful small-market professional sports franchises in the world and have won 13 NFL championships, including the first two AFL-NFL Championship games (Super Bowls I and II), Super Bowl XXXI and Super Bowl XLV. The state's support of the team is evidenced by the 81,000-person waiting list for season tickets to Lambeau Field.

The Milwaukee Brewers, the state's only major league baseball team, play in American Family Field in Milwaukee, the successor to Milwaukee County Stadium since 2001. In 1982, the Brewers won the American League Championship, marking their most successful season. The team switched from the American League to the National League starting with the 1998 season. Before the Brewers, Milwaukee had two prior Major League teams. The first team, also called the Brewers, played only one season in the newly founded American League in 1901 before moving to St. Louis and becoming the Browns, who are now the Baltimore Orioles. Milwaukee was also the home of the Braves franchise when they moved from Boston from 1953 to 1965, winning the World Series in 1957 and the National League pennant in 1958, before they moved to Atlanta.

The Milwaukee Bucks of the National Basketball Association play home games at the Fiserv Forum. The Bucks won the NBA Championship in 1971 and 2021.

The state also has minor league teams in hockey (Milwaukee Admirals) and baseball (the Wisconsin Timber Rattlers, based in Appleton and the Beloit Sky Carp of the High-A minor leagues).  In addition to these affiliated minor league teams, Wisconsin has the American Association of Professional Baseball 2020 Championship team, the Milwaukee Milkmen based in Franklin, and in 2022 the Lake Country Dockhounds will begin playing in Oconomowoc. Wisconsin is also home to the Madison Mallards, the La Crosse Loggers, the Lakeshore Chinooks, the Eau Claire Express, the Fond du Lac Dock Spiders, the Green Bay Booyah, the Kenosha Kingfish, the Wisconsin Woodchucks, and the Wisconsin Rapids Rafters of the Northwoods League, a collegiate all-star summer league. In addition to the Packers, Green Bay is also the home to an indoor football team, the Green Bay Blizzard of the IFL. The state is home to the seven-time MISL/MASL Champion Milwaukee Wave.

Wisconsin is also home to Forward Madison FC, which is a professional soccer team that plays in the USL League One.

Wisconsin also has many college sports programs, including the Wisconsin Badgers, of the University of Wisconsin–Madison and the Panthers of the University of Wisconsin–Milwaukee. The Wisconsin Badgers football former head coach Barry Alvarez led the Badgers to three Rose Bowl championships, including back-to-back victories in 1999 and 2000. The Badger men's basketball team won the national title in 1941 and made trips to college basketball's Final Four in 2000, 2014, and 2015. The Badgers claimed a historic dual championship in 2006 when both the women's and men's hockey teams won national titles.

The Marquette Golden Eagles of the Big East Conference, the state's other major collegiate program, is known for its men's basketball team, which, under the direction of Al McGuire, won the NCAA National Championship in 1977. The team returned to the Final Four in 2003.

Many other schools in the University of Wisconsin system compete in the Wisconsin Intercollegiate Athletic Conference at the Division III level. The conference is one of the most successful in the nation, claiming 107 NCAA national championships in 15 different sports as of March 30, 2015.

The Semi-Professional Northern Elite Football League consists of many teams from Wisconsin. The league is made up of former professional, collegiate, and high school players. Teams from Wisconsin include: The Green Bay Gladiators from Green Bay, The Fox Valley Force in Appleton, The Kimberly Storm in Kimberly, The Central Wisconsin Spartans in Wausau, The Eau Claire Crush and the Chippewa Valley Predators from Eau Claire, and the Lake Superior Rage from Superior. The league also has teams in Michigan and Minnesota. Teams play from May until August.

Wisconsin is home to the world's oldest operational racetrack. The Milwaukee Mile, located in Wisconsin State Fair Park in West Allis, Wisconsin, held races there that considerably predate the Indy 500.

Wisconsin is home to the nation's oldest operating velodrome in Kenosha where races have been held every year since 1927.

Sheboygan is home to Whistling Straits golf club which has hosted PGA Championships in 2004, 2010 and 2015 and the Ryder Cup golf competition between USA and Europe in 2020. The Greater Milwaukee Open, later named the U.S. Bank Championship in Milwaukee, was a PGA Tour tournament from 1968 to 2009 held annually in Brown Deer. In 2017, Erin Hills, a golf course in Erin, Wisconsin, approximately 30 miles northwest of Milwaukee, hosted the U.S. Open.

See also 
 Index of Wisconsin-related articles
 List of people from Wisconsin
 Outline of Wisconsin

Notes

References

Further reading 
 
 
 
  Detailed popular history and many biographies.
 
 
  Detailed popular history & biographies.
 
 
 
 .
 
 
 
  Detailed guide to every town and city, and cultural history.
See additional books at History of Wisconsin

External links

 
  (Archived December 12, 2019)
 
 
 
 
 Wisconsin Health and Demographic Data La Crosse Medical Health Science Consortium
 Energy Profile for Wisconsin—Economic, environmental, and energy data
 Wisconsin Historical Society
 The State of Wisconsin Collection from the UW Digital Collections Center
 Wisconsin Free Speech Legacy
 Wisconsin Department of Tourism
 .
 
 
 .

 
States of the United States
States and territories established in 1848
1848 establishments in the United States
Midwestern United States
Contiguous United States